Wates Station (WT) is a class-I railway station located in Wates, Kulon Progo Regency, Special Region of Yogyakarta, Indonesia owned by the Operational Area VI Yogyakarta of Kereta Api Indonesia. The station is located at an altitude of +18 meters, at the south of Alun-Alun Wates and Kulon Progo Regency government complex. It is the main station of the regency, serving various passenger rail services both long distance and local/commuter rail services.

Building 
Initially, Wates Station had four railway tracks with line 1 being a straight track. Since double-track line between Yogyakarta and Kutoarjo began operation in 2006–2007, track 1 is used as a straight track towards Yogyakarta, track 2 is used as a straight track towards Kutoarjo, tracks 3 and 4 is used for train stops, and track 5 as a new track which is often used only for parking or loading and unloading of ballast stone transport. The station layout thus was also changed.

The station has now been fitted with a canopy in its platform to protect passengers. Canopy installation was also carried out at  Station.

Services 
The following is a list of train services at Wates Station as of 2022.

Intercity trains 
Executive and economy class

Executive and premium economy class

Business and economy class

Premium economy class

Economy class

Local 

Commuter rail and airport rail link 

References 

Railway stations in Yogyakarta
Kulon Progo Regency